Acinipe is a genus of grasshoppers in the family Pamphagidae. There are more than 20 described species in Acinipe, found in Southern Europe and North Africa.

Species
These 29 species belong to the genus Acinipe:

 Acinipe algerica (Brunner von Wattenwyl, 1882)
 Acinipe algeriensis Descamps & Mounassif, 1972
 Acinipe angustipennis Chopard, 1943
 Acinipe arthemisiae Descamps & Mounassif, 1972
 Acinipe atlantis Descamps & Mounassif, 1972
 Acinipe bicoloripes Descamps & Mounassif, 1972
 Acinipe calabra (Costa, 1836)
 Acinipe comptei Llorente del Moral, 1980
 Acinipe deceptoria (Bolívar, 1878)
 Acinipe dissipata Descamps & Mounassif, 1972
 Acinipe eulaliae Olmo-Vidal, 2009
 Acinipe expansa (Brunner von Wattenwyl, 1882)
 Acinipe galvagnii Cusimano & Massa, 1977
 Acinipe hesperica Rambur, 1838
 Acinipe ignatii Llorente del Moral & Presa, 1983
 Acinipe mabillei (Bolívar, 1878)
 Acinipe megacephala Werner
 Acinipe minima Werner, 1931
 Acinipe muelleri (Krauss, 1893)
 Acinipe nadigi Descamps & Mounassif, 1972
 Acinipe olivacea Werner
 Acinipe paulinoi (Bolívar, 1887)
 Acinipe perisi Llorente del Moral & Presa, 1983
 Acinipe rifensis Descamps & Mounassif, 1972
 Acinipe rungsi Descamps & Mounassif, 1972
 Acinipe segurensis (Bolívar, 1908)
 Acinipe strigata Roberts, 1938
 Acinipe tibialis (Fieber, 1853)
 Acinipe tubericollis Werner, 1932

References

Further reading

 

Pamphagidae